Kirk White (born May 21, 1962) is a Pagan author and leader in establishing a seminary system and pastoral counseling credentials for the Neopagan faith.  He is the founder and past president of Cherry Hill Seminary and co-founder of the National Association of Pagan Schools and Seminaries. He is a member of the Vermont House of Representatives representing the Windsor-Rutland district.

Contributions to Neopaganism
White is listed as one of the 25 Most Influential Pagans in the Wild Hunt blog.  He was interviewed for Margot Adler's Drawing Down the Moon, and has contributed material to other Pagan works.

He founded the Church of the Sacred Earth:  a Union of Pagan Congregations (for which he serves as executive director as the Wiccan Church of Vermont; White was later ordained as minister through this first legally-recognized Wiccan church in Vermont.  He has served as both national public information officer and co-president of the Covenant of the Goddess.

White's multidisciplinary education includes a master of arts in mental health and addictions counseling, as well as training in acupuncture and Chinese herbalism; he also holds an honorary doctorate of divinity.  White holds positions in the organizations of the Freemasons, Knights Templar, Rosicrucians, and the Hermetic Order of the Golden Dawn.

Books
White has published four books:
Adept Circle Magick, 
Advanced Circle Magick, 
Operative Freemasonry, 
Masterful Magick,

Festivals
White is a frequent lecturer at Pagan gatherings and festivals.  He speaks on such topics as organization, pastoral counseling, initiation, and magical practice.  Those festivals that have featured White include:
Between the Worlds
Delmarva Pagan Pride Festival
Florida Pagan Gathering
Harvest Home Gathering
Pantheacon
Pagan Spirit Gathering
Rites of Spring
Council of Magickal Arts
Laurelin Community's Annual Lughnasah Festival (which was founded by and organized yearly by White)
New York City Pagan Pride Day 2013

References

1962 births
Living people
People from Bethel, Vermont
Wiccan priests
American Wiccans
American male writers
Democratic Party members of the Vermont House of Representatives